Thelymitra pallidiflora, commonly called the pale sun orchid, is a species of orchid that is endemic to Victoria. It has a single erect, channelled, leaf and up to ten white to very pale blue, self-pollinating flowers which only open on hot days.

Description
The lobe on the top of the anther is dark brown or black with a yellow tip, tubular and gently curved. The side lobes curve upwards and have, toothbrush-like tufts of white hairs. Flowering occurs in October and November but the flowers open only on warm to hot days, and then only slowly.

Taxonomy and naming
Thelymitra pallidiflora was first formally described in 2004 by Jeff Jeanes and the description was published in Muelleria from a specimen collected near Bells Beach. The specific epithet (pallidiflora) means "pale-flowered".

Distribution and habitat
The pale sun orchid grows in woodland in the central south of Victoria, near Lysterfield, Anglesea and Crib Point.

References

pallidiflora
Endemic orchids of Australia
Orchids of Victoria (Australia)
Plants described in 2004